Kenshi (written: 研之, 玄師, 健史, 拳士, 憲史, 健士, 健嗣, or 建之) is a masculine Japanese given name. Notable people with the name include:

, Japanese sumo wrestler
, Japanese manga artist
, Japanese baseball player
, Japanese sumo wrestler
, Japanese long jumper
, Japanese musician

Japanese masculine given names